Tangxia is a town under the direct jurisdiction of Dongguan prefecture-level city in Guangdong province, China. It is located in the southeast of Dongguan's prefectural area and borders the Shenzhen districts of Longhua to the south and Guangming to the west.

Transportation 
 Tangxia will host four Dongguan Rail Transit stations under the current plans for construction of Line 4:

 Tangxiaxi (Tangxia West)
 Tangxia Center (Interchange with the North > South branch of the same line)
 Dongxing Dadao
 Tangxiadong (Tangxia East)

There is a bus service from Tangxia to Shenzhen Bao'an International Airport in Shenzhen.

References
"Teaching In Tangxia" by Henry Virgin 

Geography of Dongguan
Towns in Guangdong